Paul Diop (born 16 October 1958) is a Malian judoka. He competed at the 1980 Summer Olympics and the 1984 Summer Olympics.

References

External links
 

1958 births
Living people
Malian male judoka
Olympic judoka of Mali
Judoka at the 1980 Summer Olympics
Judoka at the 1984 Summer Olympics
Place of birth missing (living people)
21st-century Malian people